Shewanella basaltis is a Gram-negative, rod-shaped and motile bacterium from the genus of Shewanella which has been isolated from black sand from Soesoggak in Korea.

References

External links
Type strain of Shewanella basaltis at BacDive -  the Bacterial Diversity Metadatabase

Alteromonadales
Bacteria described in 2008